Gevherhan Hatun ( "Gem of the Khan") was an Ottoman princess, the daughter of Mehmed the Conqueror (reign 1444–46 and 1451–81) and Gülbahar Hatun. She was the sister of Sultan Bayezid II (reign 1481–1512).

Early life
Gevherhan Hatun was the daughter of Sultan Mehmed II known as "The Conqueror", and his concubine Gülbahar Hatun. She was the full sister of Sultan Bayezid II.

Marriage
In 1474, Gevherhan married Ughurlu Muhammad, a son of Aq Qoyunlu ruler, Uzun Hassan. Ughurlu Muhammad had rebelled against his father and sought refuge by the Ottomans. Her father welcomed him and got him married to Gevherhan. 

Ottoman princesses of Mehmed's time not married non-Ottomans, whereas it was more frequent in the past. Gevherhan's marriage to Ughurlu Muhammad was the only exception, which actually proved the rule. Ughurlu Muhammad being an exile from his own land and refugee at the Ottoman court, the Aq Qoyunlu prince might be considered a kind of adjunct member of the Ottoman royal household. 

Mehmed installed his new son-in-law in the frontier province of Sivas and promised to supply him with arms and men, with which he would assert his claim to his patrimony at the proper moment. Ughurlu Muhammad was killed in the rebellion he attempted against his father in 1477.

Of this marriage, Ahmad Beg was born. Because of his father's death, Mehmed had his grandson brought to Istanbul. Ahmed married his uncle Sultan Bayezid II's daughter Aynışah Sultan in 1489.

After that date, there is no news of Gevherhan, although, according to some sources, she remarried to Sinan Pasha, an important statesman under Bayezid II who is said to be married to the sultan's sister. 

It is possible that he was Gevherhan's second husband or that he was married to one of Bayezid's half-sisters (Bayezid doesn't appear to have any other full sisters) and the source doesn't mention the difference between full sister and half-sister.

Death
When she died around 
1514, she was buried beside her mother in her mausoleum located in Fatih Mosque, Istanbul.

In popular culture
In the 2013 Turkish series Fatih, Gevherhan Hatun is played by Turkish actress Hande Soral.

Ancestry

References

Sources

Year of birth missing
Year of death missing
15th-century Ottoman princesses